The 2017 WAC men's basketball tournament is a postseason men's basketball tournament for the Western Athletic Conference. It will be held from March 9–11, 2017 at Orleans Arena in Paradise, Nevada. The winner of the tournament, New Mexico State, will receive the conference's automatic bid to the NCAA tournament with a 70-60 win over California State-Bakersfield.

Seeds
Grand Canyon was ineligible to participate in the conference tournament during its transition to Division I. The remaining seven teams will participate in the tournament. The top seed will receive a bye to the semifinals. Teams will be seeded by record within the conference, with a tiebreaker system to seed teams with identical conference records.

Schedule

Bracket

* denotes overtime period

Tournament
WAC men's basketball tournament
WAC men's basketball tournament
WAC men's basketball tournament
21st century in Las Vegas
Basketball competitions in the Las Vegas Valley
College basketball tournaments in Nevada
College sports tournaments in Nevada